APEC Youth Science Festival is a science fair run by the Asia-Pacific Economic Cooperation (APEC). It is for 15–18-year-olds with an interest in science–technology, and seeks to break down cultural barriers for learning. It began in 1998 in Seoul. The president of the Republic of Korea proposed to host the APEC Youth Science Festival at the 2nd APEC Science and Technology Ministers' Conference on November 13, 1996.

List of festivals

References

External links
 https://web.archive.org/web/20100917232134/http://apec.org/apec/news___media/2004_media_releases/050804_youthsciencefest.html

Science competitions